The Japanese topeshark (Hemitriakis japanica) is a species of houndshark, in the family Triakidae. It can reach a length of up to 1.1 m. It is found in the subtropical northwest Pacific from China, Taiwan, Korea, and Japan, between latitudes 40° N and 21° N.

References

 

Japanese topeshark
Fish of Japan
Marine fauna of East Asia
Japanese topeshark
Japanese topeshark
Japanese topeshark